Mann in the Morning (also released as Herbie Mann in Sweden) is an album by American jazz flautist Herbie Mann featuring tracks recorded in Stockholm in 1956 and released by the Prestige label.

Reception

AllMusic awarded the album 3 stars.

Track listing
All compositions by Herbie Mann except as indicated
 "Cherry Point" (Neal Hefti) - 6:15
 "Hurry Burry" - 3:24
 "Serenata" (Leroy Anderson) - 3:01
 "Adam's Theme" - 3:29
 "Early Morning Blues" - 3:17
 "Nature Boy" (eden ahbez) - 3:24
 "Ow!" (Henry Glover, Lucky Millinder) - 6:14
 "Polka Dots and Moonbeams" (Jimmy Van Heusen, Johnny Burke) - 3:48
 "I Can't Believe That You're in Love with Me" (Jimmy McHugh, Clarence Gaskill) - 3:18
 "Song for Ruth" - 4:35
Recorded in Stockholm, Sweden on October 10, 1956 (tracks 2-5 & 8), October 12, 1956 (tracks 1, 9 & 10) and October 16, 1956 (tracks 6 & 7)

Personnel 
Herbie Mann - flute, tenor saxophone
Bengt-Arne Wallin - trumpet (tracks 1, 6, 7, 9 & 10)
Åke Persson - trombone (tracks 2-5 & 8)
Arne Domnérus - alto saxophone (tracks 1, 9 & 10)
Rolf Blomquist - tenor saxophone (tracks 1, 9 & 10)
Lennart Jansson - baritone saxophone (tracks 1, 9 & 10)
Knud Jorgenson (tracks 2-5 & 8), Rune Ofwerman (tracks 6 & 7), Gunnar Svensson (tracks 1, 9 & 10) - piano 
George Riedel - bass
Joe Harris (tracks 2-5 & 8), Egil Johansen (tracks 1, 6, 7, 9 & 10) - drums

References 

1958 albums
Herbie Mann albums
Prestige Records albums